is a Japanese sailor, who specialized in two-person dinghy (470) class. He shared gold medals with his partner Yugo Yoshida in the 470 class at the 2010 Asian Games, and later the pair represented Japan at the 2012 Summer Olympics. As throughout most of his sailing career, Harada currently trains for the ABeam Consulting Team under his personal coach and mentor Kazunori Komatsu. As of September 2013, Harada is ranked no. 190 in the world for two-person dinghy class by the International Sailing Federation.

Harada and his partner and crew member Yugo Yoshida made their official debut at the 2010 Asian Games in Guangzhou, China, where they edged out the host nation's Wang Weidong and Deng Daokun by seven-points for the gold medal in the men's 470 class, accumulating a net score of 17 points.

Harada qualified to compete in the men's 470 class at the 2012 Olympic Games by finishing sixth at World Championships in Barcelona, Spain. Teaming with Yoshida in the opening series, Harada skippered a spirited challenge on the fifth leg to deliver the Japanese duo a seventh spot in that leg, but they fell short of the medal race with an eighteenth-place finish on 131 net points.

References

External links
 
 
 
 

1985 births
Living people
Japanese male sailors (sport)
Olympic sailors of Japan
Sailors at the 2012 Summer Olympics – 470
Asian Games medalists in sailing
Asian Games gold medalists for Japan
Sailors at the 2010 Asian Games
Medalists at the 2010 Asian Games
People from Nagasaki
Sportspeople from Nagasaki Prefecture